Değirmendere is a village in Toroslar district of Mersin Province, Turkey, and part of the city of Greater Mersin. Değirmendere is situated on a high plateau of the Taurus Mountains. The population of the village was 700 as of 2012.

References

Villages in Toroslar District